Call Me by Your Name: Original Motion Picture Soundtrack is the soundtrack to the 2017 romantic drama film, Call Me by Your Name. It features songs by The Psychedelic Furs, Franco Battiato, Loredana Bertè, Bandolero, Giorgio Moroder, Joe Esposito, and F. R. David, with compositions by John Adams, Erik Satie, Ryuichi Sakamoto, Johann Sebastian Bach, and Maurice Ravel. American singer-songwriter Sufjan Stevens composed two original songs for the film, and the soundtrack also features a remix of his track "Futile Devices". Stevens's original song "Mystery of Love" was nominated for the Academy Award for Best Original Song at the 2018 ceremony. At the 61st Annual Grammy Awards, "Mystery of Love" received a nomination for Best Song Written for Visual Media and the soundtrack received one for Best Compilation Soundtrack for Visual Media.

Release
The soundtrack album was digitally released under Madison Gate Records and Sony Classical on November 3, 2017 and physically on November 17. "Mystery of Love" was first featured in the film's first trailer, released on August 1, 2017. Its music video was released on January 4, 2018, featuring footage taken at The National Archaeological Museum of Naples. It was released on vinyl on February 16, 2018. The limited release consists of 1,000 copies printed on blue vinyl and includes a poster. The limited "peach season" edition consists of 14,999 copies printed on peach-scented vinyl was released on August 3, 2018, by Music on Vinyl.

Critical reception

Call Me by Your Name: Original Motion Picture Soundtrack received positive reviews from music critics.

Track listing

Chart performance
The soundtrack debuted at number 18 on the UK Soundtrack Albums chart during the week of November 10, 2017. On March 3, 2018, it climbed to number 11, which became its peak position on the chart. It debuted at number 23 on the US Billboard Soundtrack Albums chart in the issue dated January 13, 2018, as the week's highest ranking debut. It became the greatest gainer in the following week, climbing to number 19. It peaked at number 14 on February 3, 2018.

Release history

References

External links 
 

2017 soundtrack albums
Folk soundtracks
Pop soundtracks
Sony Music soundtracks
Classical music soundtracks
Call Me by Your Name
Romance film soundtracks
Drama film soundtracks